Maximilian Raoul "Max" Steiner (May 10, 1888December 28, 1971) was an Austrian-born American composer of music for theatre and films. He was a child prodigy who conducted his first operetta when he was twelve and became a full-time professional, either composing, arranging or conducting, when he was fifteen.

Steiner composed over 300 film scores with RKO and Warner Brothers, and was nominated for 24 Academy Awards, winning three: The Informer (1935), Now, Voyager (1942), and Since You Went Away (1944). Besides his Oscar-winning scores, Steiner's other works include King Kong (1933), Little Women (1933), Jezebel (1938), Casablanca (1942), The Searchers (1956), A Summer Place (1959), and the film score for which he is possibly best remembered, Gone with the Wind (1939).

He was also the first recipient of the Golden Globe Award for Best Original Score, which he won for his score to Life with Father. Steiner was a frequent collaborator with some of the best known film directors active in the United States, including Michael Curtiz, John Ford, Howard Hawks, William Dieterle, William Wyler, Raoul Walsh, John Huston, Irving Pichel, King Vidor, and Frank Capra.

Filmography
(as per AFI's database, unless otherwise noted)

All orchestration notes, additional composition, stock music, and main/end title notes come from the Max Steiner filmography in Film Composers in America.

The following list only comprises those films for which Steiner composed the score, or was credited as providing orchestration for. In addition to the films included in this list, Steiner also contributed to hundreds of other films for which his writing provided the stock music.

1920s and 1930s

1940s

1950s
Cutter orchestrated all of the movie scores that Steiner was the sole author of in the 1950s.

1960s
Cutter orchestrated all of the movie scores that Steiner wrote in the 1960s.

References

Steiner, Max

Harold B. Lee Library-related film articles